Thomas Muster defeated Boris Becker in the final, 4–6, 5–7, 6–1, 7–6(8–6), 6–0 to win the singles tennis title at the 1995 Monte-Carlo Masters. Muster saved two championship points and came back from two sets down in the final to win what is regarded as one of the best Monte-Carlo Masters matches in history. Becker was attempting to win his first clay court title, but would never win one.

Andriy Medvedev was the defending champion, but lost in the first round to Richard Fromberg.

Seeds

  Pete Sampras (second round, retired)
  Boris Becker (final)
  Yevgeny Kafelnikov (third round)
  Goran Ivanišević (semifinals)
  Sergi Bruguera (quarterfinals)
  Michael Stich (second round)
  Alberto Berasategui (third round)
  Magnus Larsson (second round)
  Thomas Muster (champion)
  Richard Krajicek (quarterfinals)
  Andriy Medvedev (first round)
  Stefan Edberg (first round)
  Marc Rosset (third round)
  Andrea Gaudenzi (semifinals)
  Thomas Enqvist (second round)
  Jacco Eltingh (first round)

Draw

Finals

Top half

Section 1

Section 2

Bottom half

Section 3

Section 4

References

External links
 ATP Singles draw

Singles